Ñausacocha (possibly from Quechua ñawsa blind, qucha lake, "blind lake") is a  mountain and a nearby lake of the same name in the Huaguruncho mountain range in the Andes of Peru. The mountain and the lake are located in the Pasco Region, Pasco Province, Ticlacayán District, north of Huaguruncho.

References

Mountains of Peru
Mountains of Pasco Region
Lakes of Peru
Lakes of Pasco Region